Thomas Ehrhorn (born 20 March 1959) is a German politician for the Alternative for Germany (AfD) and since 2017 member of the Bundestag, the federal legislative body.

Life and career

Ehrhorn was born 1959 in the west German town of Helmstedt and became an aircraft pilot.

Ehrhorn entered the newly founded populist AfD in 2013 and is vice chairman of his party in the federal state of Lower Saxony.

After the 2017 German federal election he became member of the bundestag.

References

Living people
1959 births
Members of the Bundestag 2021–2025
Members of the Bundestag 2017–2021
Members of the Bundestag for the Alternative for Germany